In That Water is the second album by the Ghetto Twiinz, released in 1997. It was produced by Leroy "Precise" Edwards.  In That Water peaked at No. 36 on the Top R&B/Hip-Hop Albums chart and No. 13 on the Top Heatseekers charts.

Critical reception
AllMusic wrote that "much of In That Water is simply gangsta clichés, yet there are moments where the Ghetto Twiinz make it work, either because they have a clever rhyme or a solid hook."

Track listing
"Sho No Love"- 4:29
"Play On Playa"- 3:44
"Take N Money"- 3:23
"Gangsta Shit"- 4:11
"Yeagie Yah"- 3:27
"Responsibility"- 4:52
"In That Water"- 4:20
"Mind Blowin"- 3:37
"What A Way To Go"- 2:53
"Jealous Hoes"- 4:05
"Hold Up!"- 4:17
"Jump Jump!"- 3:12
"Mamma's Hurting"- 3:51
"All U Niggas"- 3:55

References

1997 albums
Ghetto Twiinz albums